A Smart Card Management System (SCMS) or Credential Management System (CMS) is a system for managing smart cards through the life cycle of the smart cards. Thus, the system can issue the smart cards, maintain the smart cards while in use and finally take the smart cards out of use (EOL). Chip/smart cards provide the foundation for secure electronic identity, and can be used to control access to facilities, networks or computers. As the smart cards are security credentials for authenticating the smart card holder (for example using two-factor authentication) the security requirements for a smart card management system are often high and therefore the vendors of these systems are found in the computer security industry.

Smart card management systems are generally implemented as software applications. If the system needs to be accessible by more than one operator or user simultaneously (this is normally the case) the software application is often provided in the form of a server application accessible from several different client systems. An alternative approach is to have multiple synchronized systems.

Smart card management systems connect smart cards to other systems. Which systems the smart card management system must connect to depends on the use case for the smart cards. Typical systems to connect to include:
 Connected smart card reader
 Unconnected (RFID) smart card reader
 Card printer
 User directory
 Certificate authority
 Hardware security module
 Physical access control systems

During the smart card lifecycle, the smart card is changing state (examples of such states include issued, blocked and revoked), the process of taking a smart card from one state to another, is the main responsibility of a smart card management system. Different smart card management systems call these processes by different names. Below a list of the most widely used names of the processes are listed and briefly explained:
 Register – adding a smart card to the smart card management system
 Issue – issuing or personalizing the smart card for a smart card holder
 Initiate – activating the smart card for first use by the smart card holder
 Deactivate – putting the smart card on hold in the backend system
 Activate – reactivating the smart card from a deactivated state
 Lock – also called block; smart card holder access to the smart card is not possible
 Unlock – also called unblock; smart card holder access to the smart card is re-enabled
 Revoke – credentials on the smart card are made invalid
 Retire – the smart card is disconnected from the smart card holder
 Delete – the smart card is permanently removed from the system
 Unregister – the smart card is removed from the system (but could potentially be reused)
 Backup - Backup smart card certificates and selected keys
 Restore - Restore smart card certificates and selected keys

Notes

References
 Schneier, Bruce (1996). "Applied Cryptography," John Wiley & Sons Inc.
 Rankl, Wolfgang & Effing, Wolfgang (2003). "Smart Card Handbook," John Wiley & Sons Ltd
 Wilson, Chuck (2001). "Get Smart," Mullaney Publishing Group
 Hansche, Susan & Berti, John & Hare Chris (2004). "Official (ISC)2 guide to the CISSP exam," Auberbach Publications
 Smart Card Industry Glossary from Smart Card Alliance

Smart cards
Public-key cryptography
Computer network security